The 1981 New South Wales referendum was held on 19 September 1981, the same day as the state election. The referendum contained two questions:
 Do you approve a Bill for an Act to extend the maximum period between general elections for the Legislative Assembly from 3 years to 4 years?
 Do you approve a Bill for an Act to require Members of Parliament to disclose certain pecuniary interests and other matters?


Amendments to the constitution
The primary change by the proposal to extend the maximum term was to alter  section 7B of the Constitution Act 1902 to provide for a maximum term of 4 years rather than 3.

The proposal to require Members of Parliament to disclose pecuniary interests was to add section 14A to the Constitution Act 1902 which provided that 
 the Governor could make regulations requiring members of parliament to disclose their pecuniary interests;
 the relevant house of parliament could declare a seat vacant if the member wilfully contravened any regulation; and
 the regulations could only be disallowed by both houses of parliament.

Results
Both questions were approved with large majorities.

See also 
 Referendums in New South Wales
 Referendums in Australia
 2016 Queensland term length referendum
 1991 Queensland four year terms referendum

References

Referendums in New South Wales
New South Wales law
1980s in New South Wales
September 1981 events in Australia